Tangasisi is an administrative ward in Tanga District of Tanga Region in Tanzania.
According to the 2012 census, the ward has a total population of 19,149. The ward was the birthplace, home of national poet Shaaban bin Robert in Vibamba village and is also his final resting place at Machui village.

References

Wards of Tanga Region